Zhang Xiaolei (born 12 January 1983) is a Chinese speed skater. She competed at the 2002 Winter Olympics and the 2006 Winter Olympics.

References

1983 births
Living people
Chinese female speed skaters
Olympic speed skaters of China
Speed skaters at the 2002 Winter Olympics
Speed skaters at the 2006 Winter Olympics
Sportspeople from Jilin
Speed skaters at the 2007 Asian Winter Games